Downsville is an unincorporated census-designated place in the town of Dunn, in Dunn County, Wisconsin, United States. The community was founded at a crossing of the Red Cedar River in 1855. As of the 2010 census, its population was 146.

Notes

External links
Downsville village website

Census-designated places in Dunn County, Wisconsin
Census-designated places in Wisconsin